Peter Richard Groves (born 30 June 1988) is an English cricketer.  Groves is a right-handed batsman who bowls right-arm medium-fast.  He was born in Bromley, Kent, and was educated at Hull Grammar School.

While studying for his degree at Loughborough University, Groves made his first-class debut for Loughborough UCCE against Leicestershire in 2010.  He made two further appearances for the team in 2010, against Kent and Hampshire.  The following season he played two further first-class matches for the team (by now called Loughborough MCCU following a name change) against Kent and Yorkshire.  In his five first-class matches, Groves scored 139 runs at an average of 69.50, with a high score of 52.  With the ball, he took 11 wickets at a bowling average of 31.72, with best figures of 5/72.

References

External links
Peter Groves at ESPNcricinfo
Peter Groves at CricketArchive

1988 births
Living people
People from Bromley
People educated at Hull Grammar School
Alumni of Loughborough University
English cricketers
Loughborough MCCU cricketers
Sportspeople from Yorkshire